Macrosiphum is a genus of aphid. During the summer populations are made of parthenogenetic females. In the fall, males and females are produced; they mate and females lay eggs that overwinter. There are over 160 spp. in 3 subgenera.

Species
The following species are recognised in the genus Macrosiphum:

Macrosiphum adianti 
Macrosiphum aetheocornum 
Macrosiphum agrimoniellum 
Macrosiphum albertinae 
Macrosiphum albifrons 
Macrosiphum alpinum 
Macrosiphum amelanchiericolens 
Macrosiphum americanum 
Macrosiphum amurense 
Macrosiphum antesplenium 
Macrosiphum atragenae 
Macrosiphum audeni 
Macrosiphum badium 
Macrosiphum bisensoriatum 
Macrosiphum bupleuri 
Macrosiphum californicum 
Macrosiphum carpinicolens 
Macrosiphum centranthi
Macrosiphum cerinthiacum 
Macrosiphum cholodkovskyi
Macrosiphum chukotense 
Macrosiphum claytoniae 
Macrosiphum clematifoliae 
Macrosiphum clematophagum 
Macrosiphum clum 
Macrosiphum clydesmithi 
Macrosiphum constrictum 
Macrosiphum corallorhizae 
Macrosiphum coriariae 
Macrosiphum cornifoliae 
Macrosiphum corydalis 
Macrosiphum coryli 
Macrosiphum corylicola
Macrosiphum creelii 
Macrosiphum cyatheae 
Macrosiphum cystopteris 
Macrosiphum daphnidis 
Macrosiphum davisi
Macrosiphum dewsler 
Macrosiphum dicentrae 
Macrosiphum diervillae 
Macrosiphum doronicicola
Macrosiphum dryopteridis 
Macrosiphum dzhibladzeae 
Macrosiphum eastopi 
Macrosiphum echinocysti 
Macrosiphum edrossi 
Macrosiphum equiseti 
Macrosiphum eupatorii 
Macrosiphum euphorbiae 
Macrosiphum euphorbiellum
Macrosiphum fagopyri 
Macrosiphum flavum 
Macrosiphum floridae 
Macrosiphum funestum 
Macrosiphum fuscicornis 
Macrosiphum garyreed 
Macrosiphum gaurae 
Macrosiphum geranii 
Macrosiphum githago 
Macrosiphum githargo 
Macrosiphum glawatz 
Macrosiphum hamiltoni 
Macrosiphum hartigi 
Macrosiphum helianthi 
Macrosiphum hellebori
Macrosiphum holmani
Macrosiphum holodisci 
Macrosiphum impatientis 
Macrosiphum inexspectatum 
Macrosiphum insularis 
Macrosiphum jasmini 
Macrosiphum jeanae 
Macrosiphum knautiae 
Macrosiphum kuricola 
Macrosiphum lambi 
Macrosiphum lapponicum
Macrosiphum laseri 
Macrosiphum lilii 
Macrosiphum lisae 
Macrosiphum longirostratum 
Macrosiphum malvicola 
Macrosiphum meixneri 
Macrosiphum melampyri 
Macrosiphum mentzeliae 
Macrosiphum mertensiae 
Macrosiphum miho 
Macrosiphum minatii 
Macrosiphum mordvilkoi 
Macrosiphum multipilosum 
Macrosiphum naazamiae
Macrosiphum nasonovi 
Macrosiphum neavi 
Macrosiphum nevskyanum 
Macrosiphum occidentale 
Macrosiphum olmsteadi 
Macrosiphum opportunisticum 
Macrosiphum oredonense 
Macrosiphum oregonense 
Macrosiphum orthocarpus 
Macrosiphum osmaliae
Macrosiphum osmaroniae 
Macrosiphum pachysiphon 
Macrosiphum paektusani 
Macrosiphum pallens 
Macrosiphum pallidum 
Macrosiphum parvifolii 
Macrosiphum pechumani 
Macrosiphum penfroense
Macrosiphum perillae 
Macrosiphum petasitis 
Macrosiphum polanense
Macrosiphum potentillae 
Macrosiphum prenanthidis 
Macrosiphum pseudocoryli 
Macrosiphum pseudogeranii 
Macrosiphum ptericolens 
Macrosiphum pteridis 
Macrosiphum pulcherimum 
Macrosiphum purshiae 
Macrosiphum pyrifoliae 
Macrosiphum ranunculi
Macrosiphum raysmithi 
Macrosiphum rebecae 
Macrosiphum rhamni 
Macrosiphum rosae 
Macrosiphum rubiarctici 
Macrosiphum rudbeckiarum 
Macrosiphum salviae 
Macrosiphum schimmelum 
Macrosiphum skurichinae 
Macrosiphum solutum 
Macrosiphum sorbi 
Macrosiphum spec 
Macrosiphum stanleyi 
Macrosiphum stellariae 
Macrosiphum suguri 
Macrosiphum symphyti 
Macrosiphum tadecola
Macrosiphum tenuicauda 
Macrosiphum tiliae 
Macrosiphum timpanogos 
Macrosiphum tinctum 
Macrosiphum tolmiea 
Macrosiphum tonantzin 
Macrosiphum trollii 
Macrosiphum tsutae
Macrosiphum tuberculaceps 
Macrosiphum valerianae 
Macrosiphum vancouveriae 
Macrosiphum vandenboschi 
Macrosiphum venaefuscae 
Macrosiphum verbenae 
Macrosiphum vereshtshagini 
Macrosiphum violae 
Macrosiphum walkeri 
Macrosiphum weberi 
Macrosiphum willamettense 
Macrosiphum wilsoni 
Macrosiphum woodsiae 
Macrosiphum yomogi
Macrosiphum zionense 
BOLD:AAA6213 Macrosiphum sp.
BOLD:AAE2383 Macrosiphum sp.
BOLD:AAI1635 Macrosiphum sp.
BOLD:AAI1636 Macrosiphum sp.
BOLD:AAI1641 Macrosiphum sp.
BOLD:AAI1643 Macrosiphum sp.
BOLD:AAK7470 Macrosiphum sp.
BOLD:ABW0543 Macrosiphum sp.
BOLD:ABZ4542 Macrosiphum sp.
BOLD:ABZ4568 Macrosiphum sp.
BOLD:ACJ0305 Macrosiphum sp.
BOLD:ADI2336 Macrosiphum sp.
BOLD:AED4708 Macrosiphum sp.

References

 Bugguide.net. Genus Macrosiphum

Sternorrhyncha genera
Macrosiphini